Mike McGlinchey (born January 12, 1995) is an American football offensive tackle for the Denver Broncos of the National Football League (NFL). He played college football at Notre Dame.

Early years
McGlinchey attended St. Joseph/St. Robert School (Warrington, Pennsylvania) and William Penn Charter School (Philadelphia, Pennsylvania). Along with football, he also played basketball in high school. He committed to the University of Notre Dame to play college football.

College career
After redshirting his first year at Notre Dame in 2013, McGlinchey played in all 13 games with one start in 2014. In 2015, he became a starter and started all 13 games at right tackle. Prior to 2016, he moved from right to left tackle. McGlinchey said he would be returning to Notre Dame for his fifth year of eligibility. He was named a team captain. He ended his collegiate career appearing in 51 games with 39 starts.

Professional career

San Francisco 49ers
The San Francisco 49ers selected McGlinchey in the first round (ninth overall) of the 2018 NFL Draft. McGlinchey was the first offensive tackle drafted in 2018 and was the second offensive linemen selected, behind Notre Dame teammate Quenton Nelson (sixth overall).

2018 season
On July 23, 2018, the San Francisco 49ers signed McGlinchey to a fully guaranteed four-year, US$18.34 million contract that includes a signing bonus of $11.41 million.

McGlinchey entered training camp slated as the starting right tackle, replacing Trent Brown who departed via trade. Head coach Kyle Shanahan named him the starting right tackle to begin the regular season, opposite starting left tackle Joe Staley. As a rookie, he started in all 16 games for the 49ers.

2019 season
In 2019, McGlinchey played 12 games and helped the 49ers with 13. He missed four games during the season due to a knee injury. He helped the 49ers beat the Minnesota Vikings and Green Bay Packers to reach Super Bowl LIV. However, the 49ers lost 31–20 to the Kansas City Chiefs.

2021 season
On May 1, 2021, the 49ers picked up the fifth-year option on McGlinchey's contract. The option guarantees a salary of $10.9 million for the 2022 season. He suffered a torn quadriceps in Week 9 and was placed on injured reserve on November 10, 2021, ending his season.

Denver Broncos
On March 15, 2023, McGlinchey signed a five-year, $87.5 million contract with the Denver Broncos.

Personal life
McGlinchey's brother, Matt, plays football for Ursinus College. 

McGlinchey's cousin, Matt Ryan, is a quarterback in the NFL.

References

External links

San Francisco 49ers bio
Notre Dame Fighting Irish bio

1995 births
Living people
Players of American football from Philadelphia
American football offensive tackles
Notre Dame Fighting Irish football players
All-American college football players
San Francisco 49ers players
Ed Block Courage Award recipients
Denver Broncos players